Frank Donner may refer to:
 Frank Donner (lawyer)
 Frank Donner (film producer)